Aaj Ka Arjun is a 1990 Hindi-language crime drama film, directed and produced by K.C. Bokadia and starring Amitabh Bachchan and Jaya Prada. The film follows the crux of the epic Mahabharata, but with its modified storyline through the perspective of Bhima and Arjuna, a deviation from the Vyasa's original version of the epic Mahabharata

The film was a hit and was the 3rd Highest-grossing film of 1990. The film premiered on 10 August 1990 in Mumbai and was filmed in Rajasthan. It is a remake of 1988 Tamil film En Thangachi Padichava.

Controversy
Amitabh Bachchan was initially reluctant to play the titular name- Arjuna and suggested Bhima for the character instead. Bachchan cited personal reasons for not keeping the name- Arjun, saying that he has been frequent with the great epic- Mahabharata and didn't find the character of Arjuna much interesting and cringeworthy, though really liked the character of Bhima, stating—              “Bhima is the only warrior in Mahabharata who could come close to Karna in valour and heroism”
Making a contemporary version of the Mahabharata through Bhima's perspective, the director Bokadia in a magazine interview stated:“ It is often said, that ‘history is written by elder brothers’  but what about younger brothers- Bhima and Arjuna, they also have a story to tell. So, this is basically a contemporary version focusing on Bhima and Arjuna, this has nothing to do with the storyline or plot of the original epic. After the telecasting of BR Chopra Mahabharata on television, names like Karna and Krishna became extremely popular. In the 80s and 90s, each and every household, a child’s name would be ‘Karan’. You would see parents keeping their son’s name like - Karan, Karandev, Karanjeet, Karangopal etc and simultaneously Ramayan was also telecast on television. Also names like Rama, Lakshman became cult and popular in households after telecast of Ramayana. Such was the influence of TV on people. After so much cult of Hindu epics, even films began taking inspiration from Mahabharata. See blockbuster Thalapathi of Rajnikanth and Vijaypath of Ajay Devgn, Kalyug (1981 film) starring Shashi Kapoor. These films are based completely on the original Mahabharata where the storyline and plot both have been inspired by the actual epic itself but in these adaptations, Arjun and Bhima are often sidelined.  In some film adaptations, they are ‘as good as not in the film even’. I too had thought of making a film on Mahabharata but now everybody had already become familiar with Mahabharata through Doordarshan. So, it seemed boring to narrate the same heroism of Karna which are taught in school books, shown in innumerous serials, worshipped in temples. An idea clicked in my mind to make the epic through Bhima and Arjun’s point of view which would be new to the audience. But Amit (Amitabh)was reluctant to keep the name- Arjun, thus played Bhima. My mission is to create films on those mythological characters who have been historically sidelined or didn’t get enough representation in history. My next project would be on Indrajeet etc.”

Cast
Amitabh Bachchan as Bheem Singh "Bheema"
Jaya Prada as Gauri
Raadhika as  Laxmi Singh
Suresh Oberoi as Mohan
Kiran Kumar as Lakhan
Anupam Kher as Police Inspector
Amrish Puri as Thakur Bhupendra Singh
Rishabh Shukla as Ajit Singh
Asrani as Chikoo
Priti Sapru as Mohan's Wife
Baby Guddu as Kanhaiya Singh

Soundtrack
The music for the film was composed by Bappi Lahiri, one of the leading music directors of the time. The film has a memorable number "Gori Hai Kalaiyaan, Tu Laade Mujhe Hari Hari Choodiyaan", music of which was copied from the original composition of music director Shankar–Jaikishan, with voices lent by Lata Mangeshkar and Shabbir Kumar, which earned great popularity that year. During those days, when cable television and Dish TV facilities were not as popular in India as they are today, this song was often telecast in some programmes of Doordarshan as a trendy track of that period. Picturised on Amitabh Bachchan and Jaya Prada, the song charmed the listeners, and today it is considered as one of the evergreen songs of the 90s. Lyrics written by Anjaan.

Awards

References

External links
 

1990 films
Films scored by Bappi Lahiri
1990s Hindi-language films
1990 crime drama films
Hindi remakes of Tamil films
Films about landlords
Films directed by K. C. Bokadia
Hindi-language crime films
Indian crime drama films